Ponoka County is a municipal district in Alberta, Canada.

History 
Ponoka County was founded on January 1, 1952. The county's first public officials were Mr. Bruce Ramsey, who directed municipal affairs, Mr. Peter McDonald as secretary-treasurer, and Mr. L.G. Saunders was head of the school system. The town gets its name from the Blackfoot word for Elk.

Geography

Communities and localities 
 
The following urban municipalities are surrounded by Ponoka County.
Cities
none
Towns
Ponoka
Rimbey
Villages
none
Summer villages
Parkland Beach

The following hamlets are located within Ponoka County.
Hamlets
Bluffton
Hoadley
Leedale
Maskwacis (formerly Hobbema)

The following localities are located within Ponoka County.
Localities 
Alberta Hospital
Crestomere
Frank Subdivision
Homeglen
Lavesta
Menaik
Morning Meadows Subdivision
Nugent
Paulson Pasture
Pleasant Hill Subdivision
Rimbey Ridge Estates
Springdale
Sunnyside
Tristram
Viewmar Estates
Willesden Green
Woodland Park

Demographics 

In the 2016 Census of Population conducted by Statistics Canada, Ponoka County had a population of 9,806 living in 3,535 of its 4,199 total private dwellings, a  change from its 2011 population of 8,856.

Government 
The chief administrative officer (CAO) of Ponoka County is Charlie Cutforth. The five members of council, Nancy Hartford, Bryce Liddle, Mark Matejka, Paul McLauchlin, and Doug Weir, were elected October 21, 2013. Councillor Paul McLauchlin, from electoral division 4, was selected the reeve in a 2013 organizational meeting.

See also 
List of communities in Alberta
List of municipal districts in Alberta

References

External links 

 
Municipal districts in Alberta